Conrad Louis Wirth (December 1, 1899 – July 25, 1993) was an American landscape architect, conservationist, and park service administrator. He served as the director of the National Park Service (NPS) between 1951 and 1964.

Wirth was born in Hartford, Connecticut, where his father Theodore was park superintendent. Seven years later, Theodore moved to Minneapolis, Minnesota, where he became superintendent of the Minneapolis Park System. Conrad Wirth grew up in the Theodore Wirth House, the home built by the Park system for his father, surrounded by city park. Conrad earned a Bachelor of Science degree in landscape gardening from Massachusetts Agricultural College (now the University of Massachusetts Amherst). He first came to the Washington, D.C., area to work for the National Capital Park and Planning Commission, and he joined the NPS in 1931. With the coming of the New Deal he supervised the service's Civilian Conservation Corps (CCC) program in the state parks. His administrative ability made him a successor to Director Arthur E. Demaray, whom he served as associate director before advancing to the top job in December 1951. Wirth's crowning achievement was Mission 66, a 10-year, billion-dollar program to upgrade park facilities and services by the 50th anniversary of the NPS in 1966. Wirth submitted his resignation to President John F. Kennedy in the fall of 1963 and left the directorship in early 1964, after recommending George B. Hartzog Jr. as his successor.

He went on to supervise the Interior Department's CCC program. A member of the National Geographic Society's Board of Trustees, he was also active in conservation and Park Service alumni affairs. He died in his sleep in 1993.

Legacy

The M/V Conrad Wirth, a 25-car ferry was named for him. The 112-ft. vessel was built in 1970 for the North Carolina Department of Transportation Ferry Division to cross Hatteras Inlet between Hatteras and Ocracoke Islands on the outer banks of North Carolina.

Further reading
Wirth, Conrad L. Parks, Politics, and the People. Norman: University of Oklahoma Press, 1980.

References

1899 births
1993 deaths
Civilian Conservation Corps people
Directors of the National Park Service
Mission 66
Artists from Hartford, Connecticut
American people of Swiss descent